Chris Korb (born October 8, 1987) is a former American soccer player who last played in 2017, for D.C. United in Major League Soccer.

Early life
Korb was born on October 8, 1987 in Ohio to Rozann and Kenneth Korb. His dad coached his first soccer team.

Career

Youth
While playing for the University School, Korb was named Team MVP in 2005 and All-Ohio honoree and also served as team captain. He began his collegiate career at Xavier University in 2006 and appeared in 18 games with 18 starts and 2 assists. He transferred to the University of Akron following the 2006-2007 season and sat out for a portion of the 2007-2008 season with a quad injury. As a redshirt sophomore, he played all 23 games and scored his first career goal against Hartwick College during the MAC semifinals in November. As a junior,  he started all 25 games and was named to the Mid-American Conference First Team. He played his final year of soccer at University of Akron in 2010, was named to the All-MAC Second Team, and started on the team that won the 2010 Men's Division 1 National Championship .

During his college years, Korb also played four campaigns with the USL Premier Development League for the Cleveland Internationals.

Professional
Korb was chosen in the second round, 31st overall, of the 2011 MLS SuperDraft by D.C. United. He signed a contract with the club on March 1, 2011, and made his professional debut on March 26 in a 2-1 loss to New England Revolution

He played a pivotal role and started every game through the 2013 Lamar Hunt Open Cup Tournament which D.C. United won

He suffered a season-ending ACL tear in his right knee against New York City FC on August 13, 2015. He experienced further complications and underwent additional surgeries, leading him to miss the entire 2016 season. DC United declined his option contract but extended his existing contract following several months of recuperation and rehabilitation. On May 4, 2017, he signed a multiyear contract with DC. He was loaned out to the Richmond Kickers of the United Soccer League and played his first game after several years of setbacks on May 18 against FC Cincinnati; he recorded one assist. His resumed play for DC United shortly after and played 16 games (starting 13) in the season. He was eligible for the 2017 MLS Re-Entry Draft but retired ahead of the 2018 season.

Honors

University of Akron
NCAA Men's Division I Soccer Championship (1): 2010

D.C. United
Lamar Hunt U.S. Open Cup (1): 2013

External links

References

1987 births
Living people
Akron Zips men's soccer players
American people of German descent
American soccer players
Association football defenders
Cleveland Internationals players
D.C. United draft picks
D.C. United players
Major League Soccer players
Richmond Kickers players
People from Gates Mills, Ohio
Soccer players from Ohio
Sportspeople from Cuyahoga County, Ohio
Xavier Musketeers men's soccer players
USL Championship players
USL League Two players